Notgrove railway station was a  Gloucestershire station on the Great Western Railway's Banbury and Cheltenham Direct Railway.

History

The station opened in 1881. It was situated about a mile north west of Notgrove village, and at 750' was the highest station on the Banbury-Cheltenham direct line. The station passed on to the Western Region of British Railways on nationalisation in 1948.  Intended as a transport hub for the surrounding agricultural area, it never fulfilled its potential.  The last passenger service to the station was on 13 October 1962.  Goods services between the station and Cheltenham ceased a few days later.

The station site is now a camp site.

References

External links
 Station on 1947 OS Map

Former Great Western Railway stations
Disused railway stations in Gloucestershire
Railway stations in Great Britain opened in 1881
Railway stations in Great Britain closed in 1962
1881 establishments in England